The Seattle Underground is a network of underground passageways and basements in the Pioneer Square neighborhood of Seattle, Washington, United States. They were located at ground level when the city was built in the mid-19th century but fell into disuse after the streets were elevated. In recent decades, they have become a tourist attraction, with guided tours taking place around the area.

History

After the Great Seattle Fire of June 6, 1889, new construction was required to be of masonry, and the town's streets were regraded one to two stories higher. Pioneer Square had originally been built mostly on filled-in tidelands and often flooded. The new street level also kept sewers draining into Elliott Bay from backing up at high tide.

For the regrade, the streets were lined with concrete walls that formed narrow alleyways between the walls and the buildings on both sides of the street, with a wide "alley" where the street was.

At first, pedestrians climbed ladders to go between street level and the sidewalks in front of the building entrances. Brick archways were constructed next to the road surface, above the submerged sidewalks. Vault lights (a form of walk-on skylight with small panes of clear glass which later became amethyst-colored) were installed over the gap from the raised street and the building, creating the area now called the Seattle Underground.

When they reconstructed their buildings, merchants and landlords knew that the ground floor would eventually be underground and the next floor up would be the new ground floor, so there is very little decoration on the doors and windows of the original ground floor, but extensive decoration on the new ground floor.

Once the new sidewalks were complete, building owners moved their businesses to the new ground floor, although merchants carried on business in the lowest floors of buildings that survived the fire, and pedestrians continued to use the underground sidewalks lit by the vault lights (still seen on some streets) embedded in the grade-level sidewalk above.

In 1907, the city condemned the Underground for fear of bubonic plague, two years before the 1909 World Fair in Seattle (Alaska-Yukon-Pacific Exposition). The basements were left to deteriorate or were used as storage. Some became illegal flophouses for the homeless, gambling halls, speakeasies, and opium dens.

Tours

Only a small portion of the Seattle Underground has been restored and made safe and accessible to the public on guided tours. In 1965, local citizen Bill Speidel formally created "Bill Speidel's Underground Tour", which continues to operate from the Pioneer Building and adjacent buildings. The tour route passes disused storefronts, artifacts, and multiple tunnel entrances.

A second tour, Beneath the Streets, was created in 2013 and uses other sections of the Underground network.

See also
 Catacombs of Paris
 Catacombs of Rome
 Edinburgh Vaults
 Mary King's Close
 Manchester Cathedral Steps
 Raising of Chicago
 Shanghai tunnels (less commonly known as the Portland Underground, in Portland, Oregon)
 Underground Atlanta
 Underground City, Montreal, modern construction of interconnected office buildings, hotels, shopping centers and other venues in Montreal's CBD 
 Underground City (underground features in cities around the world)

References

Further reading

External links
 
 Mashable: 1905-1930 The Seattle Regrade

Underground
Tourist attractions in Washington (state)
Underground cities